Carolina Crescentini (born 18 April 1980 in Rome) is an Italian actress. She is a graduate of the Centro Sperimentale di Cinematografia, and star of the box office hit movie Parlami d'amore, directed by Silvio Muccino. She worked with Giuliano Montaldo on I demoni di San Pietroburgo and Fausto Brizzi on Notte prima degli esami oggi.

In 2008 Crescentini was the leading actress video made on the song "Non c'è contatto", played by Silvia Mezzanotte and written by Emilio Munda.

Also in  2008 she was nominated to the David di Donatello for Best Supporting Actress thanks to her performance in Parlami d'amore.

Filmography

Films

Television

External links

References 

Italian film actresses
Living people
1980 births
Actresses from Rome
Centro Sperimentale di Cinematografia alumni
21st-century Italian actresses
Nastro d'Argento winners